Fireside is a Swedish, Grammis Award-winning rock band that formed in the Swedish hardcore scene in the early 1990s. After finding moderate success as a post-grunge/alternative metal band, yet tiring of playing half-filled venues, Fireside adopted an emo/pop punk sound in 1998. In 2000, with the release of Elite, the band took a more experimental approach to rock, but 2003's All You Had saw the band shift toward garage rock. After a lengthy hiatus Fireside returned to playing live in 2016 and consequently a new album named Bin Juice was released in 2022. However, only singer/guitarist Kristofer Åström and guitarist/producer Pelle Gunnerfeldt appear on the record, joined by bassist and occasional vocalist Kate Breineder and several drummers. 
 
The 1996 American Recordings reissue of their album Do Not Tailgate (originally released in 1995 by Startrec Management) featured cover art by Daniel Clowes. The record store sales counter in the 2000 film High Fidelity displayed a Fireside sticker.

Members 
 Current members
 Kristofer Åström – vocals, guitars
 Pelle Gunnerfeldt – guitars
 Kate Breineder – bass, backing vocals

 Former members
 Fredrik Granberg – drums, percussion
 Frans Johansson – bass, guitars
 Per Nordmark – drums, percussion, vibraphone

Discography

Albums 
 Fantastic Four (1994, MNW/A West Side Fabrication) (14 tracks)
 Do Not Tailgate (1995, Startrec) No. 40 SWE (EU 11 tracks / US 13 tracks / JAP 14 tracks)
 Uomini D'onore (1998, Startracks) No. 10 SWE (US 11 tracks (CD & DVD Audio) / JAP 14 tracks)
 Elite (2000, Startracks) No. 40 SWE (9 tracks)
 Get Shot (2003, Startracks/V2) No. 18 SWE (10 tracks)
 Bin Juice (2022, Startracks) (8 tracks)

Compilations/reissues 
 Hello Kids (1997) EU 30 tracks / US 21 tracks (B-sides, covers and out-takes)
 Fantastic Four (1999) 10 tracks (Remixed & remastered tracks from 1994 album, different cover art)

Singles/EPs 
 Softboy EP (1993)
 Jupiter EP (1994)
 Kilotin EP (1995)
 "Left Rustle" (1996) No. 42 SWE
 "Interlace" (1996)
 Sweatbead EP (1997) No. 42 SWE
 "Let Rasputin Do It" (1997)
 "Thing On A Spring" (2000)
 "All You Had" (2003)
 "Follow Follow" (2003)
 "Throw It Away" (2003)

Music videos 
 Kilotin
 Left Rustle
 Sweatbead
 All You Had
 Follow Follow
 The Betrayer
 Jungle Knuckle

References

External links
Startracks
FIRESIDE

Swedish musical groups
Music in Stockholm
V2 Records artists